Giovanni Cornaro (also known as Giovanni Corner) may refer to:

Giovanni I Cornaro (1551–1629), Doge of Venice 1625–1629
Giovanni II Cornaro (1647–1722), Doge of Venice 1709–1722
Giovanni Cornaro (cardinal) (1720–1789), Italian cardinal